Marc Dolez (born , in Douai, Nord) is French politician.  He represented the Nord's 17th constituency from 1988 to 1993, and again from 1997 to 2017. A former member of the Socialist Party, he was a founding member, with PS Senator Jean-Luc Mélenchon, of the Left Party.

References

1952 births
Living people
People from Douai
Socialist Party (France) politicians
Left Party (France) politicians
Deputies of the 12th National Assembly of the French Fifth Republic
Deputies of the 13th National Assembly of the French Fifth Republic
Deputies of the 14th National Assembly of the French Fifth Republic